The following is a list of school districts that serve the city of Phoenix, Arizona.

Many separate independent school districts serve Phoenix. This is a legacy of the city expanding through annexation of bordering territory; many of the school districts were in existence prior to their territories becoming part of the city.

Some are elementary school districts that serve grades kindergarten through 8. The elementary school districts are paired with high school districts that serve grades 9 through 12.

Small portions of Phoenix are served by unified school districts, which serve grades K through 12.

Unified Districts
 Cave Creek Unified School District
 Chandler Unified School District
 Deer Valley Unified School District
 Dysart Unified School District
 Paradise Valley Unified School District
 Peoria Unified School District
 Scottsdale Unified School District

High School Districts
 Glendale Union High School District
 Phoenix Union High School District
 Tempe Union High School District
 Tolleson Union High School District

Elementary School Districts
 Alhambra Elementary School District
 Balsz Elementary School District
 Cartwright Elementary School District
 Creighton Elementary School District
 Fowler Elementary School District
 Isaac Elementary School District
 Kyrene Elementary School District
 Laveen Elementary School District
 Littleton Elementary School District
 Madison Elementary School District
 Murphy Elementary School District
 Osborn Elementary School District
 Pendergast Elementary School District
 Phoenix Elementary School District
 Riverside Elementary School District
 Roosevelt Elementary School District
 Tempe Elementary School District
 Tolleson Elementary School District
 Union Elementary School District
 Washington Elementary School District
 Wilson Elementary School District

 
School districts
School districts